John Tapton was Dean of St Asaph from 1463 until 1493.

Tapton was born in Rutland. He was Master of St Catharine's College, Cambridge from 1480 to 1487.

References   

People from Rutland
15th-century Welsh clergy
Deans of St Asaph
Masters of St Catharine's College, Cambridge
1543 deaths